The Fifth Avenue Commercial Buildings comprise a row of six buildings in St. Cloud, Minnesota, United States, constructed between 1883 and 1914.  The buildings were listed on the National Register of Historic Places in 1982 for their local significance in the themes of architecture and commerce.  As St. Cloud's best preserved commercial block from the turn of the 20th century, it was nominated for reflecting the commercial architecture and history of the city's downtown business district.

See also
 National Register of Historic Places listings in Stearns County, Minnesota

References

External links

Buildings and structures in St. Cloud, Minnesota
Commercial buildings on the National Register of Historic Places in Minnesota
National Register of Historic Places in Stearns County, Minnesota
Neoclassical architecture in Minnesota
Queen Anne architecture in Minnesota